The 1965 season of the Paraguayan Primera División, the top category of Paraguayan football, was played by 9 teams. The national champions were Olimpia.

Results

Standings

Championship play-offs

Relegation play-offs

References

External links
Paraguay 1965 season at RSSSF

Para
Paraguayan Primera División seasons
Primera